Michel is originally a French name. It is used today in France, Canada, Quebec, Belgium and other French-speaking countries. The name is particularly common in French (from where the standard English pronunciation is derived), German (already in Middle High German), Dutch, and Afrikaans. In these instances Michel is equivalent to the English personal name Michael, although in Dutch the name Michaël is also common. Mitxel is the Basque form of Michael. When of Czech, Slovak or Polish origin it is a variant of the personal name Michal. When of Greek origin, the surname Michel is a shortened form of various patronymic derivatives of Michael. Examples of such are Michelakis, Michelakakis, or Michelakos.

Persons with the surname
 Annett Wagner-Michel (born 1955), German chess master
 Anneliese Michel (1952–1976), a German woman said to be possessed by demons
 Augustin Michel (1855-1931), a Belgian World War I general
 Charles Michel (politician) (born 1975), Belgian politician and current President of the European Council
 Charles D. Michel (born 1963), Admiral and 30th Vice Commandant of the United States Coast Guard
 Hartmut Michel (born 1948), German biochemist
 Henri Michel (historian) (1907–1986), a French historian
 Hermann Michel (1912–1984), a German Nazi SS officer
 Jean Michel (poet) (died 1501), 15th-century French dramatic poet
 Jean Michel (politician) (born 1949), French politician
 Joseph Edward Michel (1917–1961), Ghanaian soldier
 Joseph Eugène Michel (1821–1885), French lawyer who was Representative, then Senator of Basses-Alpes
 Kathrin Michel (born 1963), German politician
 Luis Ernesto Michel (born 1979), a Mexican professional footballer
 Nettie Leila Michel (1863–1???), American business woman, author, magazine editor
 Paul Redmond Michel (born 1941), an American former federal judge
 Pierre Michel (born 1942), a French literary scholar
 Pras Michel (born 1972), an American musician
 Robert H. Michel (1928-2017), a United States politician
 Rolf Michel (born 1945), a German physicist
 Sony Michel, (born 1995), NFL football player
 Thomas Michel (basketball) (born 1995), a German basketball player

Persons with the given name
 Michel Aflaq (1910–1989), Syrian founder of the Ba'ath ideology
 Michel Aoun, (born 1935), Lebanese Army Commander and president of Lebanon 
 Michel Barrera (born 1980), American fugitive 
 Michel Bernanos (1923–1964), French poet and fantasy writer
 Michel Bakhoum (1913–1981), Egyptian civil engineer, professor
 Michel Brunet (disambiguation), several persons
 Michel Cadotte (1764–1837), Canadian Métis fur trader 
 Michel Camilo (born 1954), Dominican Republic pianist and composer 
 Michel Chiha (1891–1954), Lebanese banker, politician, writer and journalist
 Michel Corneille the Younger (1642–1708), French painter, etcher and engraver
 Michel Corrette (1707–1795) French organist, composer and author of musical method books
 Michel de Certeau (1925–1986), French Jesuit and scholar
 Michel Djotodia, Central African politician who was President of the Central African Republic from 2013 to 2014
 Michel Doukeris (born 1973), Brazilian businessman, CEO of AB InBev
 Michel Drucker (born 1942), French journalist and TV host
 Michel Ferrari (born 1954), Swiss neurologist
 Michel Field (born 1954), French journalist
 Michel Foucault (1926–1984), French philosopher, historian and sociologist
 Michel Friedman (born 1956), German politician and TV host
 Michel Galabru (1922–2016), French actor
 Michel Garbini Pereira (born 1981), Brazilian footballer
 Michel Godard (born 1960), French tuba player and jazz musician
 Michel Godbout, Canadian news anchor
 Michel Goma (1932–2022), French fashion designer
 Michel Gondry (born 1963), French screenwriter, and director
 Michel Hamaide (born 1936), French politician
 Michel Henry (1922–2002), French philosopher and novelist
 Michel Houellebecq (born 1958),  French writer
 Michel Joachim Marie Raymond (1755–1798), French general
 Michel Kaplan (born 1946), French Byzantinist
 Michel El Khoury (born 1926), is a Lebanese politician
 Michel Legrand (1932–2019), French musical composer, arranger, conductor, and pianist
 Michel Macquet (1932–2002), French javelin thrower
 Michel Moore, LAPD chief
 Michel Murr (1932–2021), Lebanese politician
 Michel Ney (1769–1815), French soldier and military commander during the French Revolutionary Wars and Napoleonic Wars
 Michel de Nostredame (1503–1566), French astrologer, physician and reputed seer
 Michel van Oostrum (born 1966), Dutch footballer
 Michel Pastor (1944–2014), Monagasque businessman and art collector
 Michel Pereira (disambiguation), several people
 Michel Petrucciani (1962–1999), French jazz pianist
 Michel Pezet (born 1942), French politician
 Michel Polnareff (born 1944), French singer
 Michel Platini (born 1955), French football manager and player, president of UEFA
 Michel Rabagliati, Canadian cartoonist
 Michel Rocard (1930–2016), French politician
 Michel Rojkind (born 1969), Mexican architect
 Michel Samaha (born 1948), Lebanese politician
 Michel Georges Sassine (1927–2014), Lebanese politician 
 Michel Sikyea (1901–2002), Canadian aboriginal rights activist
 Michel Soymié (1924–2002), French sinologist
 Michel Sulaiman (born 1948), commander of the Lebanese Armed Forces
 Michel Tapié (1909–1987),  French critic, curator, and art collector
 Michel Teló (born 1981), Brazilian singer
 Michel Temer (born 1940), Brazilian politician and former President
 Michel Therrien (born 1963), Canadian hockey coach
 Michel Thomas, language teacher
 Michel Tremblay (disambiguation), several persons
 Michel Tromont (1937–2018), Belgian politician
 Michel Trudeau, young son of Pierre Trudeau
 Michel Vaxès (1940–2016), French politician.
 Michel Verne (1861–1925), French writer; son of Jules Verne
 Michel Vialay (born 1960), French politician

Middle name
 Jean-Michel Basquiat (1960-1988), American artist
 Yechiel Michel Epstein (1829–1908), Lithuanian Rabbi, author of Aruch Hashulchan
 Yechiel Michel Feinstein (1906–2003), Rabbi, Haredi rosh yeshiva in Israel
 Jean Michel Jarre (born 1948), French composer, performer and music producer
 Jean-Michel Pilc (born 1960), French-born jazz pianist

Fictional characters
 Deutscher Michel, personification of the German nation, usually depicted wearing a nightcap and nightgown
 Michel Bollinger, a character from the visual novel The House in Fata Morgana
 Michel Gerard, a concierge from the TV series Gilmore Girls
 Michel Vaillant, a French comic book character
 Michel Volban de Cabelle, a character from the 2006 anime Glass Fleet
 Michel Desjardins from The Kane Chronicles series by Rick Riordan
 Michel Starzynski from Sarah's Key a novel by Tatiana de Rosnay
Eikichi “Michel” Mishina from the video game, ‘’Persona 2: Innocent Sin’

See also
 Saint-Michel (disambiguation)

References

Given names
Masculine given names
Arabic masculine given names
French masculine given names
German masculine given names
Swiss masculine given names
Dutch masculine given names
Coptic given names
Surnames from given names